Bernardino or Giovanni Bernardino Nocchi (May 8, 1741 – January 27, 1812) was an Italian painter, mainly of sacred and historic subjects.

Biography
He was born in Lucca and trained there under Giuseppe Antonio Luchi until 1767. By 1769, Nocchi and his contemporary Stefano Tofanelli had moved to Rome, where they entered the studio of Niccolò Lapiccola.

In 1780, he helped decorate the Apostolic palace and in 1785 the Stanza delle Stampe of the Vatican Library. In 1797, he painted the Transit of St Joseph for the church of San Secondo in Gubbio; in 1804, he completes the Death of St Anne for the Basilica di San Frediano in Spoleto. Returning to Rome, Nocchi painted in 1799 a portrait of Prince Camillo Borghese; in 1803, Glory of Santa Pudenziana (for the church of the same name), San Novato, and San Timoteo. In 1807 he painted a portrait of Pope Pius VII.  He also painted The Dancers, Portrait of a Noble Lady and Portrait of the Venerable Marie Clotilde of France, queen of Sardinia (1809). His son, Pietro Nocchi, was also a painter.

Nocchi died in 1812 in Rome.

References

External links

Bernardino Nocchi at Artnet

1741 births
1812 deaths
18th-century Italian painters
Italian male painters
19th-century Italian painters
Painters from Lucca
Italian Baroque painters
19th-century Italian male artists
18th-century Italian male artists